Crooked Lake is a lake in South Dakota, in the United States.

Crooked Lake was so named on account of its irregular outline.

See also
List of lakes in South Dakota

References

Lakes of South Dakota
Bodies of water of Grant County, South Dakota